Teashirt homolog 3 is a protein that in humans is encoded by the TSHZ3 gene. In mice, it is a necessary part of the neural circuitry that controls breathing.  The gene is also a homolog of the Drosophila melanogaster teashirt gene, which encodes a zinc finger transcription factor important for development of the trunk.

Tshz3-knockout mice do not develop the respiratory rhythm generator (RRG) neural circuit, which is a pacemaker that produces an oscillating rhythm in the brainstem and controls autonomous breathing. The RRG neurons are present, but are abnormal. Those mice do not survive because they don't initiate breathing after birth. Tshz3 is being studied for its relationship to infant breathing defects in humans.

TSHZ3 has been identified as a critical region for a syndrome associated with heterozygous deletions at 19q12-q13.11, which includes autism spectrum disorder (ASD) symptoms such autistic traits, speech disturbance and intellectual disability, as well as renal tract abnormalities. Mice with heterozygous Tshz3 deletion (Tshz3lacZ/+) show enrichment of ASD-related gene orthologs in the cerebral cortex, functional alterations of corticostriatal circuitry and ASD-relevant behavioral abnormalities.

Postnatal conditional deletion of Tshz3 in mouse induces behavioral deficits mimicking ASD, as well as abnormalities in synaptic transmission and plasticity in the corticostriatal circuit. These changes are associated to dysregulation of the cortical expression of more than 1000 genes, in particular coding for synaptic components, half of which has human orthologues involved in ASD.

References

Further reading

External links